Montenegrins in Serbia may refer to:

 Montenegrins of Serbia, an ethnic minority in Serbia
 Citizens of Montenegro, living or working in Serbia

See also
 Montenegro-Serbia relations
 Montenegrins (disambiguation)
 Montenegro (disambiguation)
 Serbia (disambiguation)